The Woodstock Playhouse is an American summer stock theater located at 103 Mill Hill Road in Woodstock, New York. Founded in 1938, the not-for profit theater, which is owned by the Pan American Dance Foundation, hosts theatre, music and other presentations throughout the year. The original building burned in 1988, with the current building opening in June 2011.

References

External links

Woodstock, New York
Theatres in New York (state)
Theatres completed in 2011